{{Automatic taxobox
| fossil_range = Pliocene - Recent
| image = Hyrax on the Rocks.JPG
| image_caption = Rock hyrax (Procavia capensis)
| taxon = Procavia
| authority = Storr, 1780
| type_species = Cavia capensis 
| type_species_authority = Pallas, 1766
| subdivision_ranks = Species
| subdivision = 
Procavia capensisProcavia antiquaProcavia pliocenicaProcavia transvaalensis}}Procavia is a genus of hyraxes. The rock hyrax (P. capensis) is currently the only extant species belonging to this genus, though other species were recognized in the past, including P. habessinica and P. ruficeps, both now relegated to subspecific rank.

Several fossil species are known as well, the oldest dated to the Early Pliocene, including:Procavia antiqua (syn. Procavia robertsi)Procavia pliocenicaProcavia transvaalensis (syn. Procavia obermeyerae'')

References

External links
 
 

 
 
Mammal genera
Mammal genera with one living species
Taxa named by Gottlieb Conrad Christian Storr